The Tainan TSG GhostHawks are a Taiwanese professional basketball team based in Tainan City, Taiwan. The team is owned by Taiwan Steel Group and coached by Ma I-Hung, with Chien Wei-Cheng as the general manager. The GhostHawks were founded in 2021 and won 0 T1 League championship.

There have been 3 head coaches for the Tainan TSG GhostHawks franchise and haven't won any T1 League championship.

Key

Coaches
Note: Statistics are correct through the end of the 2021–22 T1 League season.

References

Tainan TSG GhostHawks
Basketball in Taiwan lists
T1 League head coaches